The Power of Fear, also known as Evil, is a 2006 Russian gothic horror film directed by Oleg Fesenko and starring Valery Nikolaev in the lead. It is loosely based on Nikolai Gogol's story "Viy".

Plot summary
A journalist (Valery Nikolaev)  is sent on an assignment to investigate paranormal phenomena occurring in a nearby town, but on the way he gets caught up in a haunted mansion to shelter from the rain, from where all his troubles begin.

Cast
 Valery Nikolaev as Ivan
 Evgeniya Kryukova as Marryl 
 Lembit Ulfsak as Chief Sheriff
 Arnis Licitis as Mr. Patch
 Juhan Ulfsak as Deputy #1 
 Rain Tolk as Deputy #2
 Ita Ever as Old Lady
 Ian Rekkor as Priest
 Peeter Volkonski as Doctor
 Anu Lamp as Kathleen 
 Kati Kivitar as Waitress Margo
 Epp Eespäev as Waitress Debora
 Anastasia Ruusmaa as Third Waitress
 Margus Prangel as Mechanic
 Tõnu Kark as Cook

Production
The film was mainly shot in Estonia and had early working titles of The Last Prayer and Viy: In the Power of Fear.

References

External links
 

2006 fantasy films
2006 films
2006 horror films
Films about witchcraft
Films based on Viy (story)
Films shot in Estonia
Gothic horror films
Russian fantasy films
Russian horror films